České Radiokomunikace is a telecommunications company in the Czech Republic. The company offers a complex portfolio of telecommunications and ICT services with their own infrastructure for wholesale and business customers.

The company owns its own network with a lot of infrastructure, therefore the CRA can offer wireless/optical options. They also offer voice services, internet connection, and data solutions (for example being a distributor of analog (AM/FM)/digital radio and digital TV).

History 
The company was founded in 1963 under the name Správa radiokomunikací. During the Czech privatization (as a consequence of the communist regime ending in 1989), the company was transferred in 1994 to ČESKÉ RADIOKOMUNIKACE a.s. In 2001, the privatization was complete and the company started to specialize itself to distributing telecommunication and TV/radio airing. In 2005, the company ceased to exist and all of its revenue was transferred to the JTR Management a.s. company, which was then promptly renamed to RADIOKOMUNIKACE a.s., while still using the trademark of ČESKÉ RADIOKOMUNIKACE. In 2006, the company got the stocks of phone carrier Tele2. The company ceased in 2007 and its revenue was transferred to a company called BLJ Czech, a.s., which was immediately renamed to RADIOKOMUNIKACE a.s., and later (though still in the year 2007) to České Radiokomunikace a.s. In 2009, the company's local telecommunications division was bought by T-Mobile Czech Republic. A year later, the acquisition of the 3rd multiplex of the then new terrestrial TV (DVB-T) was completed by Czech Digital Group. In 2011, the company, yet again, ceased, and its revenue was transferred to Morava Czech Communications Holdings a.s., which renamed itself back to České Radiokomunikace a.s. Right after that, the company was sold to Macquarie Infrastructure and Real Assets Europe for 14 billion CZK. The same year, the company entered the information and communication industry and started offering cloud computing services.

Property 
The company owns more than 600 objects for their wireless signal distribution, which covers the entire country.

References

Telecommunications companies of the Czech Republic
Telecommunications companies established in 1963
Czech brands
1963 establishments in Czechoslovakia
Companies of Czechoslovakia